Ravi Kumar Dahiya (born 12 December 1997), also known as Ravi Kumar or Ravi Dahiya, is an Indian freestyle wrestler who won a silver medal at the 2020 Tokyo Olympics in the 57 kg category. Dahiya is also a bronze medallist from 2019 World Wrestling Championships and a three-time Asian champion. In the 2022 Birmingham Commonwealth Games, he won the gold medal in the men's 57kg freestyle wrestling category at Birmingham, England.

Early life
Ravi was born on 12 December 1997 in a Jat family and hails from the village Nahri in Sonipat district, Haryana. Since age 10, Dahiya was trained by Satpal Singh at the Chhatrasal Stadium in North Delhi. His father Rakesh Dahiya, a small farmer, would travel around 39 km every day from their village to the Chhatrasal stadium to deliver fresh milk and fruits, which were part of his wrestling diet, for more than a decade. Ravi is a devotee of Lord Shiva.

Career

Dahiya started wrestling in his early teens and won the silver medal in the 2015 Junior World Wrestling Championships at Salvador de Bahia in the 55 kg freestyle category. He picked up an injury in 2017 which kept him out of action for more than a year. In his comeback year, he won the silver medal at the 2018 World U23 Wrestling Championship in Bucharest, India's only medal at the competition, in the 57 kg category. Dahiya remained unbeaten at the 2019 Pro Wrestling League, representing the title winning team, Haryana Hammers.

He was ranked fifth at the 2019 Asian Wrestling Championships in Xi'an, after losing the bronze medal match.

In his World Championships debut in 2019, Dahiya defeated the European champion Arsen Harutyunyan in the round of 16, and the 2017 world champion Yuki Takahashi in the quarterfinal, to earn one of the six available quota places for the 2020 Summer Olympics. He lost to defending champion and eventual gold medalist Zaur Uguev in the semifinal round. However, he managed to take the bronze after defeating Reza Atri of Iran. On the back of his medal win, Dahiya was included in the Ministry of Youth Affairs and Sports' Target Olympic Podium Scheme (TOPS) in October 2019.

Dahiya won gold at the 2020 Asian Wrestling Championships in New Delhi and the 2021 Asian Wrestling Championships in Almaty.

At the 2020 Summer Olympics, Dahiya won his first two bouts on technical superiority. In the semifinal, he pinned the Kazakh wrestler Nurislam Sanayev down in the final minute to win by fall, after trailing in the bout on points. There were reports that Dahiya endured a bite from his opponent, Nurislam Sanayev in the semi-final match. In the final, Dahiya had to settle for silver as he was defeated 4–7 on points by ROC wrestler Zaur Uguev. Dahiya became the second Indian wrestler to win an Olympic silver after Sushil Kumar.

At the 2022 Yasar Dogu Tournament, he won the gold medal after defeating Uzbek Gulomjon Abdullaev 11–10 in the final. At the 2022 World Wrestling Championships, he lost to Uzbekistan's Gulomjon Abdullaev in the pre-quarterfinals.

Awards and recognition

National award
 2021 – Major Dhyan Chand Khel Ratna Award, highest sporting honour of India.

Rewards
For winning the silver medal at the 2020 Tokyo Summer Olympics
  from the Government of India.
  from the Government of Haryana.
 from the Board of Control for Cricket in India
 from the Indian Olympic Association.

International competition

Olympics

World Championship

U23 World Championship

World Junior Championship

Commonwealth Games

Asian Wrestling Championship

Record against opponents

References

External links
 
 
 

1997 births
Living people
Indian male sport wrestlers
Sport wrestlers from Haryana
People from Sonipat district
World Wrestling Championships medalists
Asian Wrestling Championships medalists
Wrestlers at the 2020 Summer Olympics
Olympic wrestlers of India
Olympic silver medalists for India
Medalists at the 2020 Summer Olympics
Olympic medalists in wrestling
Wrestlers at the 2022 Commonwealth Games
Commonwealth Games gold medallists for India
Commonwealth Games medallists in wrestling
Recipients of the Khel Ratna Award
Medallists at the 2022 Commonwealth Games